Robert Bonar Valentine (born 10 May 1939) is a former football referee from Scotland. He is mostly known for refereeing two matches in the 1982 World Cup in Spain: the infamous "Great Gijon Swindle" between West Germany and Austria, and the second-round match between Poland and the Soviet Union.

He was also one of the linesmen (the other was Bruno Galler) for the classic semi-final that year between France and West Germany at the Estadio Sanchez Pizjuan in Seville.

Valentine also refereed the Euro 84 match between France and Belgium at the Stade de la Beaujoire in Nantes, and the Euro 88 match between West Germany and Denmark at the Parkstadion in Gelsenkirchen.

After his refereeing retirement, Valentine became the Scottish FA's Head of Refereeing. Outside of football, he worked as a print compositor.

Footnotes

References
  Profile

1939 births
Sportspeople from Dundee
Living people
Scottish football referees
FIFA World Cup referees
1982 FIFA World Cup referees
Olympic football referees
Football referees at the 1980 Summer Olympics
UEFA Euro 1984 referees
UEFA Euro 1988 referees
Scottish Football League referees